Havana Marguerite Solaun (born 23 February 1993) is a Jamaican professional footballer who plays as a midfielder for Houston Dash of the American National Women's Soccer League (NWSL) and the Jamaica women's national team.

Solaun began her professional career with the NWSL's Seattle Reign FC in 2015. After two years, she was traded to the Washington Spirit. Solaun is a former United States youth international, most recently at the U23 level.

Early life
Solaun's family moved back to the United States when she was two. She attended Buchholz High School in Gainesville, Florida. From 2008 to 2010, she was named to the All-Area Girls Soccer first-team by The Gainesville Sun.

University of Florida Gators, 2011–2014
Solaun attended the University of Florida from 2011 to 2014 where she played soccer for the Florida Gators and was a four-year starting midfielder. Solaun earned All-Southeastern Conference first team honors in 2014 and 2013 and also appeared on the NSCAA All-South Region teams those same seasons. As a senior in 2014, Solaun registered collegiate best totals for goals(9), assists (9) and points (27) to finish second among the Gators in each category.

Club career

Seattle Reign FC, 2015–2016
Solaun was selected 15th overall by Seattle Reign FC during the 2015 NWSL College Draft. After signing with the team a few months later, Seattle Reign FC head coach Laura Harvey said, "Havana is a young, talented player who is very good on the ball. The most important thing for us is she is also very comfortable in possession, whether under pressure or not, she can keep control of the ball and move it in the way that we want her to." Solaun made her debut for the Reign during 2–0 win over the University of Washington during preseason play but sat out the season after suffering an injury. During the team's first 2016 pre-season match against the Portland Thorns, Solaun scored the game-winning goal in the 75th minute helping the Reign win 2–0. She made her debut for the club during its season opener against Sky Blue FC on April 17. She scored her first goal during a match against the Houston Dash leading the Reign to a 1–0 win.

Washington Spirit, 2017–2018 
Solaun's player rights were traded to the Washington Spirit in November 2016 in exchange for Spirit players Christine Nairn and Madalyn Schiffel. She signed with the team in December. Solaun would become a regular starter for the Spirit, earning 24 appearances and scoring 5 goals during her first season.

Klepp IL, 2019
Despite a new contract offer from Washington Spirit, Solaun elected to join Norwegian club Klepp IL on a free transfer for 2019.

Paris FC, 2020
On January 12, D1 Féminine team Paris FC announced they had signed Solaun.

Apollon Ladies, 2020
Unable to appear for Paris FC due to the coronavirus pandemic, Solaun signed for Cypriot club Apollon Ladies for their UEFA Women's Champions League campaign.

North Carolina Courage, 2020–2022
Solaun signed a short-term contract to play for North Carolina Courage during the 2020 NWSL Fall Series. In January 2021, she signed a one-year contract with a one-year option for the team. In September 2022, the club bought out the remainder of her contract and released her to free agency.

Houston Dash, 2023–
In January 2023, Solaun joined Houston Dash on a two-year contract.

International career
Born in Hong Kong to Afro-Cubans father (Felix Solaun, born in the United States shortly after his parents Félix Solaun and Hilda Luis moved from their native Havana) and a Jamaican mother (Sandra Brower, formerly Solaun,  Phillips), Solaun was originally eligible to play for the national teams of Hong Kong, the United States, Cuba or Jamaica.

Youth national teams
Solaun represented the United States on the under-17 (2010 CONCACAF Women's U-17 Championship), under-20 and under-23 national teams. As Solaun had previously lived in Canada (also in Singapore), she participated in a centralized camp of the Canadian national team in February 2015.

Jamaica senior national team
Following the historic FIFA Women's World Cup qualification by the Jamaica women's national football team, Solaun was named to its training camp roster in January 2019. She made her debut on March 3 that year in a 3–2 friendly win against Chile.

On June 18, 2019, Solaun scored Jamaica's first-ever goal in a FIFA Women's World Cup shortly after coming on as a second-half substitute against Australia.

International goals
Scores and results list Jamaica's goal tally first

Personal life
Solaun's first name, Havana, is a tribute to her paternal grandparents' birthplace.

See also
 List of University of Florida alumni

References

External links
 
 Player profile at 2019 FIFA Women's World Cup
 Washington Spirit player profile
 Florida Gators player profile (archived)
 

1993 births
Living people
Jamaican women's footballers
Jamaica women's international footballers
Hong Kong women's footballers
People with acquired Jamaican citizenship
Women's association football midfielders
Klepp IL players
Toppserien players
2019 FIFA Women's World Cup players
Jamaican people of American descent
Jamaican people of Cuban descent
Jamaican expatriate women's footballers
Jamaican expatriates in Norway
Expatriate women's footballers in Norway
People with acquired American citizenship
Sportspeople from Gainesville, Florida
Soccer players from Florida
American women's soccer players
Florida Gators women's soccer players
OL Reign draft picks
OL Reign players
Washington Spirit players
National Women's Soccer League players
United States women's under-20 international soccer players
American sportspeople of Cuban descent
American sportspeople of Jamaican descent
American expatriate women's soccer players
American expatriate sportspeople in Norway
North Carolina Courage players
Houston Dash players
Hong Kong people of Cuban desent
Hong Kong people of Jamaican descent